The men's super-G competition of the Lillehammer 1994 Olympics was held at Kvitfjell on Thursday, 17 February.

Norway's Kjetil André Aamodt was the defending Olympic and World Cup super-G champion and Marc Girardelli led the current season.

Germany's Markus Wasmeier won the gold medal, downhill champion Tommy Moe took the silver (on his 24th birthday), and Aamodt was the bronze medalist.

Results
The race was started at 11:00 local time, (UTC +1).

References

External links
FIS results

Men's Super G
Winter Olympics